Sahamaitso is a river in the region of Alaotra-Mangoro in eastern Madagascar.

It is situated near the towns of Amboasary Gara, Tanifotsy and Ampangabe.

References

Rivers of Alaotra-Mangoro
Rivers of Madagascar